Elijah Connor is an American pop singer and songwriter. He is known for starring in season two of The Four: Battle for Stardom on Fox with Sean Combs.

Career
Connor was born in Detroit, Michigan, and had a role on Donald Trump's reality television series The Ultimate Merger. He landed a minor role in the movie Sparkle starring Whitney Houston, Mike Epps, and Jordin Sparks. He played himself in the NBC/Oxygen drama series Player Gets Played.

Connor's single "Mill Ticket" feat. Tee Grizzley reached a highest position of No. 69 on the Billboard Indicator Charts in 2018 and No. 20 on the charts in South Africa.

In October 2021, Connor signed with Blackground Records 2.0.

Early life

Connor graduated from Oakland County's Farmington High School. While majoring in medicine in college, he worked as a print and runway model for Sears and Armani. 

Connor is the younger cousin to musician Prince.

Singles and EPs
"Let Go"
"We On"
"Don't U Wanna Man"
"This Christmas"
"Mill Ticket"
”Reputation”
"Lemon & Lime"

References

External links 

1990 births
Living people
American male actors
American male pop singers
American male songwriters
21st-century American singers
21st-century American male singers
Songwriters from Michigan
American male rappers
American contemporary R&B singers
Participants in American reality television series
American Internet celebrities
Rappers from Atlanta
African-American businesspeople
Rappers from Detroit
American soul singers